is a small and harmless near-Earth object that will pass within  of Earth around 17 December 2024. At 17 December 2024 06:14 UT it has a 0.23% (1-in-430) chance of impacting Earth.

At the time of the virtual impactor (17 December 2024 06:14) the asteroid is expected to be  from Earth but has an uncertainty region of ±.

It will come to perihelion (closest approach to the Sun) on 30 January 2023.

References

External links 
 
 
 

Minor planet object articles (unnumbered)

Potential impact events caused by near-Earth objects
20221217
20221217